Bulbophyllum inaequale is a species of orchid.

inaequale
Taxa named by Carl Ludwig Blume